Pedro Juan Figueroa (March 8, 1951 – July 7, 2017) was a well-known Puerto Rican actor of film and telenovela.

Early years
He studied his regular academic degrees between the municipalities of San Juan, Guaynabo and Bayamón. It was precisely at this school stage that he peered into the world of acting. He earned a B.A. in humanities with specialization in theater in 1973 at the University of Puerto Rico.

Selected filmography
...And God Created Them (1979)
Tres destinos (1994)
Señora tentación (1994)
Dueña y señora (2006)

Politics
In 2008 he also entered in politics as a candidate of the Popular Democratic Party for senator for the Senatorial District of San Juan but didn't won the election.

Death
Pedro Juan Figueroa on July 7, 2017 at HIMA San Pablo Hospital in Bayamón, Puerto Rico after a battle with pancreatic cancer.

External links

1951 births
2017 deaths
Deaths from cancer in Puerto Rico
Deaths from pancreatic cancer
People from Santurce, Puerto Rico
Puerto Rican male film actors
Puerto Rican male telenovela actors
University of Puerto Rico alumni